Herbert Lewis (1858–1933) was a Welsh politician.

Herbert Lewis may also refer to:

Herbert L. Lewis (1898-1971), American journalist and newspaper editor
Herbert Clyde Lewis (1909–1950), American novelist
Herbert S. Lewis (born 1934), professor of anthropology
Sir Herbert Lewis of the Lewis baronets
Herbie Lewis (1941–2007), American hard bop double bassist
Herbie Lewis (ice hockey) (1906–1991), Canadian ice hockey left winger

See also
Bert Lewis (disambiguation)
Herbert Louis (1928–2016), American orthopedic surgeon